HD 219134 h, also known as HR 8832 h, is an exoplanet orbiting around the K-type star HD 219134 in the constellation of Cassiopeia. It has a minimum mass of 108 Earth masses, which indicates that the planet is likely a gas giant. Unlike HD 219134 b and c it is not observed to transit and thus its radius and density are unknown.

This planet was initially reported in two 2015 papers; one referred to it as HD 219134 e, while the other found different, and more accurate, parameters for it and so treated it as a different planet, designated HD 219134 h. It is now generally referred to by the HD 219134 h designation.

References

Cassiopeia (constellation)
Exoplanets discovered in 2015
Exoplanets detected by radial velocity
Giant planets